In fluid dynamics, Green's law, named for 19th-century British mathematician George Green, is a conservation law describing the evolution of non-breaking, surface gravity waves propagating in shallow water of gradually varying depth and width. In its simplest form, for wavefronts and depth contours parallel to each other (and the coast), it states:

  or  

Green's law is often used in coastal engineering for the modelling of long shoaling waves on a beach, with "long" meaning wavelengths in excess of about twenty times the mean water depth. Tsunamis shoal (change their height) in accordance with this law, as they propagate – governed by refraction and diffraction – through the ocean and up the continental shelf. Very close to (and running up) the coast, nonlinear effects become important and Green's law no longer applies.

Description

According to this law, which is based on linearized shallow water equations, the spatial variations of the wave height  (twice the amplitude  for sine waves, equal to the amplitude for a solitary wave) for travelling waves in water of mean depth  and width  (in case of an open channel) satisfy

where  is the fourth root of  Consequently, when considering two cross sections of an open channel, labeled 1 and 2, the wave height in section 2 is:

with the subscripts 1 and 2 denoting quantities in the associated cross section. So, when the depth has decreased by a factor sixteen, the waves become twice as high. And the wave height doubles after the channel width has gradually been reduced by a factor four. For wave propagation perpendicular towards a straight coast with depth contours parallel to the coastline, take  a constant, say 1 metre or yard.

For refracting long waves in the ocean or near the coast, the width  can be interpreted as the distance between wave rays. The rays (and the changes in spacing between them) follow from the geometrical optics approximation to the linear wave propagation. In case of straight parallel depth contours this simplifies to the use of Snell's law.

Green published his results in 1838, based on a method – the Liouville–Green method – which would evolve into what is now known as the WKB approximation. Green's law also corresponds to constancy of the mean horizontal wave energy flux for long waves:

Wavelength and period
Further, from Green's analysis, the wavelength  of the wave shortens during shoaling into shallow water, with

along a wave ray. The oscillation period (and therefore also the frequency) of shoaling waves does not change, according to Green's linear theory.

Derivation
Green derived his shoaling law for water waves by use of what is now known as the Liouville–Green method, applicable to gradual variations in depth  and width  along the path of wave propagation.

Wave equation for an open channel
Starting point are the linearized one-dimensional Saint-Venant equations for an open channel with a rectangular cross section (vertical side walls). These equations describe the evolution of a wave with free surface elevation  and horizontal flow velocity  with  the horizontal coordinate along the channel axis and  the time:

In the Liouville–Green method, the approach is to convert the above wave equation with non-homogeneous coefficients into a homogeneous one (neglecting some small remainders in terms of ).

Transformation to the wave phase as independent variable
The next step is to apply a coordinate transformation, introducing the travel time (or wave phase)  given by

  so  

Now the wave equation transforms into:

The next step is transform the equation in such a way that only deviations from homogeneity in the second order of approximation remain, i.e. proportional to

Further transformation towards homogeneity
The homogeneous wave equation (i.e. Eq. () when  is zero) has solutions  for travelling waves of permanent form propagating in either the negative or positive -direction. For the inhomogeneous case, considering waves propagating in the positive -direction, Green proposes an approximate solution:

Then

Now the left-hand side of Eq. () becomes:

This has the solution:

where the constant  has been set to one, without loss of generality. Waves travelling in the negative -direction have the minus sign in the argument of function  reversed to a plus sign. Since the theory is linear, solutions can be added because of the superposition principle.

Sinusoidal waves and Green's law
Waves varying sinusoidal in time, with period  are considered. That is

Consequently, also  in Eq. () has to be a sine wave, e.g.  with  a constant.

which is Green's law.

Flow velocity

and  an additional constant discharge.

For sinusoidal waves with velocity amplitude  the flow velocities shoal to leading order as

This could have been anticipated since for a horizontal bed  with  the wave amplitude.

Notes

References

Green

Others

 
 
 
 
 
 
 

Fluid dynamics
Water waves